Brown laurel may refer to a number of tree species:

Cryptocarya glaucescens
Cryptocarya triplinervis